Joaquín Pardo (28 February 1946 – 16 October 2020) was a Colombian footballer. He competed in the men's tournament at the 1968 Summer Olympics.

References

External links

1946 births
2020 deaths
Colombian footballers
Colombia international footballers
Olympic footballers of Colombia
Footballers at the 1968 Summer Olympics
Sportspeople from Barranquilla
Association football midfielders
Atlético Junior footballers